Copacabana Municipality is the first municipal section of the Manco Kapac Province in the La Paz Department, Bolivia. Its capital is Copacabana.

Isla del Sol (Island of the Sun) and Chelleca island are situated within the municipality.

Subdivision 
The municipality is divided into three cantons.

The people 
The people are predominantly indigenous citizens of Aymaran descent.

Ref.: obd.descentralizacion.gov.bo

Languages 
The languages spoken in the Copacabana Municipality are mainly Aymara and Spanish.

Places of interest 
 Chinkana
 Iñaq Uyu
 Pachat'aqa
 Pillkukayna
 Yampupata Peninsula

See also 
 Virgen de Copacabana

References 
 
 obd.descentralizacion.gov.bo

External links 
 Map of Manco Kapac Province

Municipalities of La Paz Department (Bolivia)